Maurice Duplessis was Premier of Quebec, Canada, from 1936 to 1939 and again from 1944 to 1959 as leader of the Union Nationale (UN) caucus in the Legislative Assembly of Quebec, the lower house of the Quebec Legislature. The first term of the longest-serving premier of the province since Confederation lasted three years (1936-1939) and was interrupted when he lost a snap election in 1939. He returned to power in 1944 and ruled the province uninterruptedly until his death in September 1959, maintaining majorities in three following elections (1948, 1952 and 1956). The premier's death threw the Union Nationale into disarray. The next year, the party lost power to the Liberals under Jean Lesage, who reversed a lot of Duplessis's policies and radically changed Quebec's politics by leading the province through the Quiet Revolution.

Duplessis became premier on 17 August 1936, shortly after he took full control of the Union Nationale, initially a coalition between the Action libérale nationale (ALN), composed of a group of dissident Liberal s, and its junior partner, the Conservatives, of which Duplessis was leader prior to these parties' merger into the UN. He finished the consolidation of his grip over the new party, which he would maintain until his death. The first term proved difficult for Duplessis as the Great Depression spawned numerous problems on the economic front. Duplessis's first term marked the introduction of old-age pensions, minimum wages for all workers, strengthening of workplace accident protections, the creation of the Ministry of Health and the institution of a popular rural loan program. At the same time, borrowing soared to the point the federal government had to intervene to restrict it and the laissez-faire policies of his predecessors, which he previously promised to put an end to, were continued (notably, Duplessis refused to nationalize the hydroelectric plants). A controversial act aimed to repress communists was passed during the first term, known as the Padlock Law.

During the second period of Duplessis governments, the economic situation improved thanks to the post–World War II expansion that the Western world entered into. Duplessis generally promoted a model of economic development with little state intervention, low taxation and very limited government-sponsored welfare. The budget was always balanced and the province noted solid economic growth and much investment into the province's resources, usually by large out-of-province companies and with few conditions. Significant progress in rural electrification and building schools was noted during these fifteen years. He also approved the current flag of Quebec.

Duplessis was known for strong advocacy for the provincial autonomy, to the point of refusing federal subsidies, investments and social programs in the province. The government cracked down on increasingly powerful trade unions as well as the Jehovah's Witnesses, while also maintaining a cozy (and often clientelist and corrupt) relationship with business interests and the Catholic Church. The cooperation of the government with the highest tiers of the clergy (unlike in his first term) has been particularly close, with many healthcare, social and education duties being delegated or shared with church officials. This, together with the government's authoritarian tendencies and staunch conservatism, led many contemporary observers to describe Duplessis's Quebec as a somewhat backward region relative to the rest of North America, and some of his strongest critics to label the period the Grande Noirceur (Great Darkness).

First government (1936–1939)

Composition 

The first government of Maurice Duplessis was formed in peculiar circumstances. The Union Nationale at the time was far from a monolith party, as it included both former ALN and Conservative members. Fourteen of these formed the cabinet. Onésime Gagnon, Duplessis's challenger in the 1933 Conservative leadership contest, was appointed Minister of Mines, Hunting and Fisheries, and four former Liberals received their ministerial seats; however, Philippe Hamel, one of the main ideologues of the late Action libérale nationale, was not offered a position in the provincial cabinet. Among other consequences of the 1936 election, Camillien Houde, who had a feud with Duplessis, unexpectedly decided to resign from his mayorship of Montreal, citing bad relations with the new Premier, despite a looming election three months later (Houde lost it to a candidate favoured by the Union Nationale).

Duplessis quickly became conflicted with his minister of roads, François Leduc, who was deeply critical of his being forced to cooperate with business interests of the "friends of the party". Leduc, however, refused to resign, so Duplessis, who accused the minister of roads of various "abuses", decided to request the Lieutenant Governor to dismiss the whole government, only to secretly assemble it later from the same members but without the recalcitrant minister – the first time ever since Confederation that a premier used this method to fire a government member. Maurice has also seen a group of five people, led by Philippe Hamel and which also included Oscar Drouin, Ernest Grégoire, René Chaloult and Adolphe Marcoux, quit the Union Nationale altogether and found a short-lived Parti National, after he failed to keep up on his electoral pledges to fend off foreign capital. He thus assumed the interim positions of the minister of roads and minister of lands and forests after Leduc and Drouin left the government. This was in addition to the position of Premier of Quebec and the Attorney General of Quebec, to which position he appointed himself for the whole duration of his terms.

Economical and welfare policies 

During his speech from the Throne, Duplessis emphasized that his priority was giving "[advantage to] the human capital over money capital". He announced four measures seeking to implement his agenda: creation of the Farm Credit Bureau, abolition the so-called Dillon law (which was adopted to restrict the possibility of challenging 1931 election results, as the Conservatives then sought to do), adoption of an old-age pension program together with the federal government and enhancement of the law on workplace accidents, as well as a ban on ministers to sit on corporate boards of directors. In particular, the rural loan program, which Duplessis instituted due to his conviction that agriculture still was the main locomotive of economic progress in the province, proved extremely popular in the countryside, which the new party exploited to the full and which, according to Michel Sarra-Bournet, was the main factor of Union Nationale's longevity.

This was, however, where the similarities with the electoral pledges ended. Despite assurances that he would reform the economy, the policies he pursued largely mirrored those of the Liberals his party had just deposed. He also opened the province to more foreign capital, notably to Robert R. McCormick, an American media mogul and outspoken critic of the New Deal policies, who built a new paper plant in Baie-Comeau. Duplessis also resented the nationalization of hydroelectric plants, as some ALN members proposed while the Union Nationale was still a coalition. This attracted accusations of hypocrisy from his adversaries, and even some members of his own party were not happy with what they saw was "selling off Quebec to the foreigners". As a result, five MLAs left his party due to this about-face. The condition of Quebec's economy did not improve during his term due to the reverbations of the Great Depression, which, however, Duplessis blamed on Ottawa for what he said was an artificial restriction of the province's borrowing power. Public debt ballooned from $150 million to $286 million during his three years in power (C$ to C$ in 2020 dollars), and the tempo of the emission of obligations during his first term exceeded that of all of prior administrations since Confederation. It prompted Ottawa to control the province's borrowing, which Duplessis decried as an invasion on Quebec's fiscal autonomy.

His social welfare record in the first term was somewhat progressive. Old-age pensions and workplace accident protections were instituted during his first year in office, as were some public works projects, such as the completion of the Montreal Botanical Garden. The Union Nationale was the first Quebec cabinet to include the Ministry of Health, and it also financed the new , a research facility similar to Paris's Pasteur Institute. In line with the Church's teaching, Duplessis launched a program of assistance to needy mothers (but not to unwed, divorced or separated women), as well as to the blind and the orphaned.

Duplessis adopted the Fair Wage Act and created the Fair Wage Board. Before the Fair Wage Act, only women were entitled to a minimum wage, but Duplessis extended this to (almost all) workers for the first time. The law was far from ideal: trade unions were unwilling to embrace the scheme (they preferred collective bargaining instead, which led to agreements that were not regulated by the Fair Wage Act); the law excluded railway, agriculture and home servants; companies repeatedly requested exemptions from the regulations, and the government's application of the law was patchy or even used to suppress wage increases. The Board itself issued hundreds of decisions that further complicated its enforcement. By 1940, minimum wages were raised above Ontario levels, but almost a fifth of workers were not paid what was they were due.

Societal issues 

A deeply devout person, Duplessis regularly engaged with the Catholic Church officials and enticed them to support him by making numerous symbolic moves. For instance, when Brother André, whom he met in his elementary school in Montreal, died on 6 January 1937, he had a mausoleum built in his honour. The following year, in his opening speech to the National Eucharistic Congress in Quebec City, Duplessis stressed he did not accept the ideas coming from the French Revolution and underlined his Catholic faith. Duplessis was the premier who introduced the crucifix to the debate hall of the Legislative Assembly. This could have been a nod to his father's ultramontanism, but it was more probably a continuation of Louis-Alexandre Taschereau's policies, who introduced a "universal" prayer in 1922 and also ordered to place crucifixes in Quebec courtrooms. At the same time, the premier did not intend to give as much power to the clergy it had under Taschereau, throwing the Church out of the lawmaking process related to social and moral issues it used to have access to. In fact, only part of the clergy supported Duplessis at the time, and many more preferred Parti National's manifestos.

The defining feature of his first term was the fierce opposition to communism, something that would persist in later terms, too. Duplessis said that "communism must be considered the top public enemy, despised and to be despised"; Duplessis's hatred of the ideology was so strong that in 1956, in response to the news that Polish eggs arrived in Montreal, his campaign took a full-page ad saying: "The Quebeckers are forced to eat communist eggs!" Le Chef condemned Canada's recognition of the communist government of Poland and triggered a diplomatic crisis when he refused to return valuable historical artifacts that were deposited in Canada for the duration of World War II, including the Jagiellonian tapestries and the coronation sword of the Polish kings, with the justification that "Stalin and his accomplices, including the usurper government of Poland, who, in Europe and in the whole world, want to establish an atheist regime, a godless government which is repugnant to the province of Quebec." He even had his agents transport them to another location under the nose of the Royal Canadian Mounted Police so that they could not send them to Poland.

In line with his ideas, and with unanimous support of the Liberals, the Union Nationale enacted the Act to Protect the Province Against Communistic Propaganda, better known as the Padlock Law, which allowed the Attorney General (Duplessis) to prosecute people propagating Bolshevism or communism, which were not defined in the law, on private or public property and banned any publications "advocating or trying to advocate" the ideologies.

The law received positive reactions from the general public as well as the clergy, but was fiercely criticized in the Anglophone press, which tied its enaction with Cardinal Villeneuve's supposed undue influence on the government. It was often arbitrarily used against left-leaning trade unions and the clergy Duplessis did not like, and the law provided no appeal to those expropriated. The frequent attacks on communists had an additional side effect of increased violence against the Jewish community, whose members were often equated to the communists. The law also spurred the creation of new human rights organizations, such as a relatively short-lived Canadian Civil Liberties Union, whose main purpose was to protect against the effects of the act and to lobby for its disallowance, which was refused in June 1938. The Padlock Law was only struck down in 1957 by the Supreme Court of Canada in Switzman v Elbling as an infringement on the federal government's powers to pass criminal statutes.Another issue of his government was the approaching of World War II and conscription-related issues. On the one hand, Duplessis tried to assure George VI of his province's loyalty towards the Crown during the king's visit in May 1939, but on the other, many French Canadians had opposed conscription when it was announced in 1917. Therefore, Duplessis, together with his aides, decided to make use of the electorate's distrust of federal war plans and general anti-conscription attitude of Quebeckers to announce a snap election, hoping to catch the Liberals by surprise and to persuade the electorate that the conscription was a means to take over provincial competences. The effort did not succeed, however, as the provincial Liberals also announced their opposition to conscription, as did Camillien Houde and some members of the Union Nationale, including Wilbrod Rousseau and Adhémar Raynault; finally, William Mackenzie King, the Prime Minister of Canada, declared that no one would be forcibly drafted, which he had to do at the time as three French Canadian ministers in King's government threatened to resign in case of Duplessis's reelection, and these could give way to supporters of conscription. At the same time, the Duplessis's government was seen as confused and unable to implement coherent policies, and the Liberals pointed to the bad state of the economy. The 1939 election was disastrous for the Union Nationale – it only received 39.1% of votes, but, more importantly, it got 15 out of 86 seats, losing the premiership to Adélard Godbout.

Second government (1944–1959)

Political atmosphere 
Following a five-year hiatus, the Union Nationale, which was running on a nationalist, conservative, anti-war, anti-refugee and pro-business platform, narrowly recaptured control of the Parliament, winning 48 seats out of 90 thanks to vote-splitting between the Liberals and the Bloc populaire. The now-opposition Liberals, however, initially dismissed the return of Duplessis as a short-term venture due to his narrow majority in the lower chamber of the Quebec Legislature and his lack of control of the Legislative Council. This thwarted some of his initial proposals, but Duplessis was still able to conduct business.

Duplessis was the third and the last long-serving premier prior to the Quiet Revolution. Unlike in his first years of government, the conditions for the second term improved immensely. After the end of World War II, Canada, along with other nations, entered a period of strong economic expansion. This helped create among the most stable political environments in the country's history, as evidenced by the long governments of Joey Smallwood (Newfoundland, 1949–1972), W. A. C. Bennett (British Columbia, 1952–1972) and Tommy Douglas (Saskatchewan, 1944–1961). Duplessis profited from the tailwinds, but his support was also in many respects due to the internal political climate of Quebec as well as some campaign innovations.

Style of governance 

While later in his life, he denounced his political opponents at any possible occasion, Duplessis initially tried to show himself as being above partisan politics and as a big-tent politician, notably by declaring in 1936 that he was "not blue, not red, not a Tory, [but] national". He also tried to appear not to be beholden only to his base electorate in the countryside, and indeed his voters and supporters included other groups such as the clergy, traditional elites, Quebec nationalists, the business community and even parts of the working class. Notably, though, English-speaking Montrealers generally voted Liberal, as they resented what they considered as excessive preoccupation with the provincial autonomy.

Duplessis wielded considerable charisma during his life. Léon Dion suggested in 1993 that he was only one of the two charismatic premiers in the history of Quebec with considerable impact on the province, the other being René Lévesque. Indeed, Duplessis, who said he was "married to the province", cared about his image as being just a normal person. It was not rare for him to attend christening, marriage or childbirth ceremonies. During his speeches, he would often use simple expressions that would strike the imagination of assembled crowds and sway the masses in his favour.

While populist elements of Duplessis's government are undeniable, the extent to which they defined or influenced the party is debated. George Swan and several other authors simply described him as a populist politician. Pierre Laporte additionally said that Duplessis would often disdainfully refer to the intellectuals as "living in the clouds". Frédéric Boily also named Duplessis, alongside Camillien Houde, with whom Duplessis reconciled in 1948, as founding fathers of French Canadian populist tradition, but argued that Union Nationale's populism was "incomplete". Boily explains that while the party definitely tried to appeal to the masses and used populist rhetoric, it did not argue for a profound revolution within the political system it was operating and did not change the system even when it had the occasion to do this.

In any case, Duplessis's charisma, strongarm governance tactics and his outsized importance earned him the nickname of "le Chef" ("the Boss"). He was at the centre of all of the decisionmaking of the government, which Conrad Black characterized thus:

The cabinet ministers were generally reduced to mere executors of Le Chef's political vision and their tasks were extensively micromanaged by him. He notably banned his vice-ministers to meet each other, fearing that the provincial affairs would slip out of his control. In the words of Leslie Roberts, the control was so intense that even during his vacation in Bermuda, Duplessis would regularly phone his ministers to send instructions about what to do, something that would cause Télesphore-Damien Bouchard, then leader of the opposition, to call this rule "the only portable dictatorship in the democratic world". The administrative state was very fragmented, if ever present, and there was no interest in a professional cadre of public servants. Under Duplessis, many government agencies that were supposed to be functioning by law did not, had numerous vacancies or acted in very unusual or opaque ways, but James Gow suggests Duplessis likely intended it to be this way since he did nothing to fix this.

Even though Duplessis formally respected the separation of powers and left all relevant authorities intact, he would not only run the government but also be the de facto rulemaker in the Legislative Assembly, as the speaker would almost always rule in his favour, thus making parliamentary debates a mere formality. When Duplessis's ministers were asked questions by other members of the Assembly, Duplessis would often interrupt them to answer the questions himself, to correct them when he was displeased by what his subordinate was saying or to give other directions in their speech. (joual for "You, shut up!"), though there is no proof of it ever happening. Leslie Roberts reported that a person who started questioning one of Duplessis's decisions met with his strongly worded rebuke announced in full cabinet meeting: "I took you out of the gutter. Keep your mouth shut, or I'll put you back where I found you!" A notable exception to this general trend was Paul Sauvé, Duplessis's informal heir apparent and short-lived successor, who was afforded a substantial degree of independence.

Electoral machine 
The campaigns of the Union Nationale were based on five prongs: a great measure of personalization of the electoral communications, usage of marketing professionals (in this case, recruited from the party officials themselves), data-guided decisionmaking, usage of all media outlets available, and lavish spending. In the pre-1948 elections, the main barrier for the Union Nationale was a shortage of campaign contributions to buy advertisements due to the Great Depression and, later on, the World War II, however, this all changed with the prosperity of the post-war years. The expenditures of the 1948 electoral campaign are estimated at $3 million (equivalent to $ million in 2020 dollars) or more, and they rose further to $5 million in 1952 ($ million in 2020) and to $9 million in 1956 ($ million in 2020). By the end of Duplessis's rule, the party's war chest ballooned to $18 million ($167 million in 2020). The Liberal Party's budget was no match to that of the Union Nationale (in 1956, expenses per candidate of the Union Nationale were six times larger than for Liberal candidates), and the opposition still tended to use old-style campaign techniques.

To a large extent, the reason for that size of spending was the government's corruption. Historians agree that favouritism and clientelism were one of the defining features of Maurice Duplessis's reign over the province, and even though a system of paternalism did exist in Quebec politics for decades, Duplessis did not hesitate to amplify and abuse it for his own ends, his initial pledges to tackle corruption notwithstanding. In 1944–48, tenders were not run at all (in Duplessis's words, they were "hypocritical" as contracts were never awarded to enemies anyway), and generally companies which the premier handpicked as friendly enough could proceed with the transaction but only after the size of the kickbacks to the party's treasury was agreed. Duplessis's government would also use discretionary grants (or threaten their withdrawal) to pressure public institutions and organizations into support of the Union Nationale. It also helped that the high clergy was very supportive of Le Chef.

Duplessis did not seem to have gained personal financial benefits from the deals. That said, Le Chef did not particularly hide from the corruption. Pork barrel spending was a norm before elections to the Assembly, which was commonly realized via road construction. Duplessis would tell the constituents in the ridings that had not yet elected a representative of the Union Nationale that if they wanted some sort of investment in their area, they would have to show him this on election day, and explicitly saying during a 1952 political meeting in Verchères that its lack of subsidies was a punishment for electing a Liberal candidate.

Campaign innovations 

The Union Nationale is recognized as the political force which has brought numerous innovations to campaigning in Quebec, which in many ways preceded those of the 1952 Republican presidential campaign in the United States, but which by that time were already used in the elections in California. This is primarily attributed to three people in Duplessis's proximity: Joseph Damase-Bégin, his minister of colonization and a former car dealer, was leading the efforts; Paul Bouchard was a journalist serving as director of propaganda and Duplessis's speechwriter, while Bruno Lafleur, the editor-in-chief of Duplessist Le Temps, was a general assistant in the campaign and analyzed the media environment.

One of the main features of the Union Nationale's campaign was a focus not on the party but on its leader. Indeed, from 1939, election posters and the more and more plentiful merchandise increasingly featured Duplessis, who managed to outgrow the Union Nationale label, and the voters were primarily asked to endorse the premier rather than his party or its ideology. The Duplessis's image was very often presented with symbols such as the new flag of Quebec and mottos that, unlike in previous elections, were uniform across the province. A particularly known slogan was the one used in 1948 and 1952: "", sometimes extended, if appropriate, with the accusation that "". An oft-repeated phrase "", however, was not a creation of Duplessis's communicators, as the slogan had already existed for almost a century by the time Duplessis came to power. The clergy of the time is often portrayed as having repurposed the slogan to agitate for Duplessis, though Alexandre Dumas argues that the clergy itself did not seem to use it much and that in fact, the people behind the slogan's revival were Duplessis's campaign officials.

Since most major outlets in Quebec initially supported the Liberals, Duplessis arranged for the distribution of his own materials, notably Le catéchisme des électeurs (see relevant passage). Over time, the Union Nationale made inroads into the media by establishing Le Temps in 1940 and by acquiring Montréal-Matin in 1947; it also tended to focus more on radio broadcasts. When the money appeared in late '40s, the Union Nationale would often buy full-page political ads in newspapers, and some of the Duplessis ads could even be found in The New York Times. Duplessis's party embraced the advent of television in the 1956 campaign and even if the Union Nationale did not use internal polling, the party finetuned their advertising based on the household television coverage by county, among other factors.

There were additional advantages for Duplessis during that period. Georges-Émile Lapalme, the Liberal leader for the most of the 1950s, did not have the political abilities of Duplessis. Le Chef also shaped the electoral system to his benefit: he did not change the borders of the ridings, and since there has been extensive migration of rural residents to urban areas, this resulted in severe malapportionment in favour of rural areas, which benefitted the Union Nationale. Also, in 1953, Duplessis's party passed the law that effectively made the appointment of electoral officials dependent on the majority's will. The first-past-the-post system further enhanced Duplessis's electoral benefits, as, despite never getting more than 52% of party votes, he consistently got a parliament that had at least three-fourths of its members from the Union Nationale.

Media and censorship 

Duplessis maintained a tight grip over the press of Quebec, though his attitude towards censorship changed depending on the political circumstances. Initially, particularly in the first term, the press was not enthousiastic or outright hostile to Duplessis, as most major outlets of Quebec were owned by Liberal sympathizers. At the same time, Duplessis cracked down on communist papers such as La Clarté, which he could do thanks to the newly passed Padlock Law. In the 1939 campaign, however, Duplessis rallied against military censorship, promising to let the press publish whatever it wished, and ignored the censors' orders to submit texts for review. After the war, with the censorship lifted, the media landscape transformed to what Xavier Gélinas called "a sympathetic neutrality with respect to the government".

Several reasons are advanced for this development. First, independently of Duplessis, the media outlets themselves became less politically affiliated than in pre-war times and more dependent on advertisement and whoever paid for it. All Quebec newspapers except Le Devoir, an anti-Duplessist outlet for most of his second term, accepted the Union Nationale's ads, which were plentiful and often took full pages, if not several, of the media outlets. The formerly Liberal press was additionally trying to modify the tone of coverage to attract the Union Nationale supporters, and it eventually became supportive of the Duplessis administration. The premier notably established good ties with Jacob Nicol, a media tycoon, and attracted sympathy of such newspapers such as La Presse, La Patrie, Le Soleil, The Montreal Star, The Gazette as well as the CKAC radio station.

Duplessis's hostility towards opposition media also played a role. The media outlets feared that its activities would be curtailed, as they were afraid Duplessis could use the power to intervene in the sales of printing paper and the printing process itself for the outlets. For instance, Duplessis's agents would often demand "corrections" to the reporting of Quebec parliamentary proceedings (which at the time were maintained by the journalists, as Quebec's Hansard did not appear yet), which in essence forced journalists not to report on what could potentially be seen as Union Nationale's wrongdoings. Most of the press did not complain about the curtailment of press freedoms, though.

There has been a vocal minority of press outlets opposing Duplessis. Le Devoir turned against him following the Asbestos strike of 1949 and became a leading voice of anti-Duplessism; in response, the premier threatened, but failed, to silence it as "Bolshevik" in 1954. Cité Libre, a low-volume but influential publication of intellectualists, was another focal point of anti-Duplessist thought, as was the faculty of social sciences at Université Laval.

The censorship under Duplessis targeted other areas as well, in particular the cinema. Yves Lever, a historian of cinematography, refers to the period as "the darkest in the censorship of cinema". It is known that Duplessis, in his capacity as Attorney General, controlled the Bureau of Censorship. He would often phone the censors to complain about the publications he did not like (mostly as he deemed them "immoral"), which disproportionately affected contemporary French films. Additionally, he restricted the distribution of the productions of the National Film Board of Canada (NFB), as he thought that the organization was a communist stronghold; ordered censor reviews of all movies produced on 16 mm films, tried (unsuccessfully) to censor TV broadcasting, and banned drive-in theatres. Radio-Canada also suffered from the interventions as the broadcaster, just like the NFB, was accused of promoting "federal centralism".

Conversely, Duplessis promoted home-grown film productions that carried Union Nationale-approved messages. , a priest and agriculturer turned documentary filmmaker – one of the few famous Quebec film directors of the time – was frequently contracted by the Service de ciné-photographie provinciale (SCP) to portray economic, scientific and technical progress of Quebec in the way which would very often align with Union Nationale priorities, though his productions very rarely made reference to Duplessis himself, and his predecessor, Adélard Godbout, intervened on a greater scale in SCP's filmmaking activities. The impact of SCP was rather small, as most of the moviemaking capacity of the time was concentrated within the NFB and, in early post-war years, also in private studios in Montreal.

Clashes over provincial autonomy 

While as a backbencher, Duplessis was not necessarily a strong advocate for provincial autonomy, that issue was among the most important of his premiership. Duplessis was not the first politician to use autonomist discourse in Quebec, but he was the one to have made it a centerpiece of his politics; as Jonathan Livernois writes, it was his "bread-and-butter issue". Duplessis affirmed in 1939 that "so long as [he] breathe[d], no one [would] touch the autonomy of the province of Quebec"; he was also known to say that no one "shall crucify the province of Quebec, even on a cross of gold." For the premier, the Constitution Act of 1867 was a treaty that could only be amended with the consent of all provinces and which envisaged a strictly federal structure of Canada, which in turn meant that certain competences must remain within the provinces, they may not be "rented out" to the federal government nor substituted by any sort of subsidy, however generous, and that the provinces should have freedom to impose their own taxes. Duplessis considered this as absolutely essential to preserve what he thought were the fundamental values of the French Canadian society – the Catholic faith, the French language and the local traditions.

For most of the time, however, the opposite trend has been ongoing in Canada. Since the Great Depression, the government powers have been increasingly concentrated in the hands of the federal officials, which was not popular in Quebec because it was seen as an attempt to assimilate French Canadians into the surrounding (dominant) English culture and customs. Adélard Godbout nevertheless ceded the province's power to regulate Unemployment Insurance and agreed to suspend the levying of two taxes in favour of the federal government, with the understanding that the powers would be returned once World War II is over. After the war, however, they remained with the federal government, and as all other provinces eventually agreed to rent out some of their powers to the federal government, Quebec was the only province actively fighting the expansion of the federal activities. Duplessis was not totally opposed to any federal initiatives – he notably consented to the constitution of the federal old-age pension program, but only after making sure that a provincial system could also function at the same time (which currently is the case in Quebec) – but in general, such proposals met with his steadfast opposition. Duplessis, angry at the centralization of powers, once demanded Ottawa to "return our loot".

Duplessis's resistance to what he estimated was an encroachment on provincial powers was particularly visible in fiscal issues. During his third term, in 1954, the Legislative Assembly passed a law creating a new provincial personal income tax (15% the size of the federal income tax), which Duplessis insisted should be deductible against the latter. Louis St. Laurent, then Prime Minister of Canada, opposed the idea, instead proposing subsidies, but he eventually caved in to Quebec's demands and allowed a reduction of 10% of the Quebeckers' federal income tax bill to pave way for the provincial tax; other concessions included leaving 9% of corporate tax and 50% of inheritance tax to the provinces. This achievement, according to Herbert Quinn, was of rather minor importance for the fiscal health of the province but was key in slowing down the federal government's advance on the provincial autonomy.

Another area of contention was the federal subsidies to universities, which were adopted on recommendation of the Massey Report. Duplessis believed that education matters ought to be within the exclusive jurisdiction of the provinces and that direct financing of the universities from the federal government infringed on provinces' rights, so he banned Quebec universities from receiving the funds. The conflict was only resolved in autumn 1959, when Paul Sauvé, Duplessis's successor, joined the program. Another program Duplessis refused to join for the same reason was the construction of the Trans-Canada Highway; as with the university subsidies, Quebec only formally signed the agreement after Duplessis's death.

To have a legal argument for his autonomist principles, Duplessis launched a parliamentary committee, called the Tremblay Commission, in 1953. Thomas Tremblay was a close friend of Duplessis's, who, among other things, advised him to introduce the provincial personal income tax. However, even though the 1956 report endorsed Duplessis's autonomist views and even argued that direct taxes should only be levied by the provinces, it was not well received by the person who ordered it. Duplessis found its content to be too philosophical, when what he was expecting was a simple answer to a practical need. He, having done everything he wanted before the report's publication, did not want to be bound by its other recommendations, nor by the pressure of outside advocacy groups, and in particular the premier resented the proposals about how the relations with municipalities and school districts should look like. The distribution of the Tremblay Report was suppressed for several months prior to the 1956 election, which, ironically, he won by rallying the population around the motto of provincial autonomy.

There has been some criticism of his autonomism from various groups, both to the left and to the right. The Anglophones (and federalists) disliked Duplessis's too frequent confrontations with Ottawa. The critics have also been talking about the paradox of fighting tooth and nail for the provincial autonomy all while being favourable to foreign capital investments. For George-Émile Lapalme, leader of the Liberals during most of the 1950s, Duplessis "has really invented the provincial autonomy even if it had been invoked before him [...] Electoral autonomy, negative autonomy, verbal autonomy, ludicrous autonomy, autonomy of filling, autonomy of emptiness. [...] Was there anyone who made it more attractive than him?" From the other side of the political debate, Lionel Groulx criticised his fight for provincial autonomy as "pseudonationalist". Duplessis's assertion of provincial autonomy did not find much support in the Supreme Court of Canada's jurisprudence of the time, which struck down some of the laws targeting minorities and dissenters as it argued that the laws infringed on the federal government's exclusive powers. Duplessis then complained that "the Supreme Court [was] like the Tower of Pisa – it always leans on one side."

Flag of Quebec 

Both Canada and Quebec had their own flags with the Union Jack, but neither was distinctive from other flags used in the Commonwealth, and the Quebec Blue Ensign was rarely used. Instead, until World War II, the French Canadians would often use the flag of France as a display of their distinctiveness (which, after a slight modification, stuck with the Acadians). At the same time, in the early 1900s, there was some heavy promotion of the Carillon-Sacré-Cœur flag, which proved a success among the people of the province (either with or without the heart). The anticipated modification of the Canadian Red Ensign failed to materialize, which upset the Quebeckers, who started to look intensively for a new flag that was truly distinctive of the province.

René Chaloult, an independent MLA, was particularly angered by the lack of change and, in his motion, criticized the Red Ensign as a flag with colonial connotations, and proposed to adopt a new one. Duplessis initially hesitated, which André Laurendeau attributed to his fear that he would be perceived as separatist. However, he then had some secret conversations with Lionel Groulx, an influential priest, who recognized that the premier wanted to be credited for its adoption. He proposed that no coat of arms should appear, and that the fleur-de-lis that formerly pointed to the centre of the flag should be kept up straight. On 21 January 1948, when the Legislative Assembly was supposed to vote on Chaloult's motion, Duplessis's government used the opportunity to adopt the modified flag by an Order in Council, though the Carillon flag flew for two weeks until it was replaced by the version now known as the "Duplessis version". The premier used the occasion to rally the population over the popular new design in the 1948 election, which Duplessis won by a landslide, capturing 82 out of 92 seats.

The Catholic Church and religious minorities 

 Before 1960, it was common for the English-language media to pejoratively refer to Quebec as the "priest-ridden province" even if the government itself was always secular. Quebec of the time was overwhelmingly Catholic and the Church was present in the daily life of the Quebeckers, as education, social services and healthcare were still mostly managed by religious organisations. This allowed Duplessis to have low-paid nuns do the jobs of teachers and nurses, and as a result, minimize budgetary expenditures and keep taxes low.

The extent to which Duplessis was close to the Catholic Church officials, and the reasons for that, is disputed. Robert Rumilly, Conrad Black and Bernard Saint-Aubin, the main biographers of Duplessis, all maintain that the clergy, with the possible exception of Archbishop Joseph Charbonneau of Montreal (1940–50), was in such friendly relations with Duplessis that the premier was rumoured to say that "the clergy eats out of my hand". Richard Jones and  also specify that the Church was very welcome in Duplessis's years. Reasons they advanced differ: for Rumilly, it was the approval of Duplessis's defence of French-Canadian traditions and conservative values, while Black and Dion suggest that Duplessis led to the fall of importance of the Church by subjecting it to his dependence, but the Church still remained loyal to the premier and was generally ideologically aligned with Duplessis. For Jones, the needs were mutual: the Catholic Church needed more funds to operate and expand but at the same time it also saved much money for Duplessis, and the fact that the clergy had a generally conservative outlook on the society was also welcome.

Alexandre Dumas, in his newest works on the role of the Catholic Church of Quebec, disputes these notions. He agrees with Conrad Black in that that the role of the Catholic Church was becoming smaller in Duplessis years, though Dumas argues that so was the case in general since 1935. He lists several examples of Duplessis's paternalist behaviour towards the high church officials and numerous symbolical gestures and presents the premier gave to them, however, as Dumas says, the rank-and-file clergy was not a monolyth and its demands were not always satisfied. Instead, Duplessis would often use religion for electoral benefit: on the one hand, he would often hint that his ideas were supported by his religious convictions or the clergy itself (even if that was not always the case), while on the other, he would use the church officials' endorsements, which were still numerous, to rally support for his ideas. Furthermore, some members of the Church seemed not to be supportive of Duplessis in the later years: many of the clergymen, unlike Duplessis, supported the workers who participated in the Asbestos strike; in 1956, two priests published an essay in an internal Catholic Church review, Ad usum sacerdotum, critiquing Duplessis's electoral practices, while in 1960, just after Duplessis's death, the state of Quebec in general was denounced by Jean-Paul Desbiens, a clergyman who wrote Les insolences du Frère Untel.

The cordial relations with the Church were not the same with other religions. The Canadian Jewish Congress, though a minor voice in Quebec, was largely dissatisfied by the Duplessis's regime; however, the main targets were the Jehovah's Witnesses. The repressions were so obnoxious that William Kaplan described the premier's efforts "the most extensive campaign of state-sponsored religious persecution ever undertaken in Canada". Quebeckers objected to Witnesses' proselytizing efforts, which in pre-war times were often done by very controversial means, including by portraying Catholic priests as fat pigs and the Pope as a prostitute. Duplessis saw them as a threat to the Catholic Church, and went so far as to declare in 1946 "a merciless war" against the sect. When charges of blasphemous libel for JW's literature fell apart, municipalities started to enact bylaws prohibiting distribution of literature on the streets or requiring a license to do so, which contributed to several arrests of the members of the sect. Frank Roncarelli, a restaurant owner in Montreal who was known for posting bail for them, was publicly admonished by Duplessis for his activities, who said that "the communists, Nazis as well as those who are the propagandists for the Witnesses of Jehovah, [had] been treated and w[ould] continue to be treated by the Union Nationale government as they deserve for trying to infiltrate themselves and their seditious ideas in the Province of Quebec". Duplessis had Roncarelli's liquor licence revoked in retaliation, and the business went bankrupt.

The court cases involving the legal harassment of Jehovah's Witnesses in Quebec resulted in a series of landmark Supreme Court of Canada cases in the domain of freedom of speech (R. v Boucher, Saumur v Quebec (City of), Lamb v Benoit) and administrative law (Roncarelli v Duplessis), which were all decided in the Witnesses' favour. In Roncarelli, Duplessis was fined over $30,000 ($278 thousand in 2020 dollars) for his abuse of power.

Relations with the Anglophone minority 
Under Duplessis, the Anglophones of Quebec retained their privileged and autonomous position within the province. Duplessis strictly respected the local arrangements that the speakers of English in the province had with respect to education, healthcare and municipal affairs. This, he hoped, would make him look good in front of English-speaking businessmen and potential investors in the province; Conrad Black also argued that Duplessis's genuine dislike of discrimination against minorities played a role. However, at the time, French Canadians were de facto discriminated against Anglophone Quebecers in the economic sphere: the poorer Anglophones were receiving higher pay for the same amount of work, compared to the majority French-speaking population, while the richer ones were dominating the business world and almost all of the middle-to-high income jobs. In 1961, even though 30% of the population was French Canadian, its control of Canadian companies amounted to single digits.

Despite such favourable treatment, support of the Union Nationale among the English-speaking Quebeckers was limited to newspapers and the business interests. The press switched from being constantly critical of the Quebec government to a conciliatory attitude towards Duplessis. The business interests appreciated his anti-Communism, fiscal conservatism, opposition to the welfare state, the fight against the trade unions and his opposition to federal centralization. In rural areas, support among the English-speaking population was also fairly strong but it was more related to the alignment with the interests of rural French Canadians. The Anglophones living on West Island of Montreal, however, were deeply dissatisfied with the Union Nationale, not only because of its nationalism, but also due to its perceived backwardness and resistance to progress; thus, the Anglophone community of Montreal remained one of the few strongholds of the provincial Liberal Party in the 1950s.

Economy

General description 

Unlike in the first years of the Duplessis's premiership, post-war Quebec was operating in a very favourable economic environment caused by the post-war economic expansion. In a large degree, the growth was caused by a boom in natural resources extraction and in the manufacturing sector, which were further enhanced by increases in productivity and efficiency. Maurice Duplessis was economically a supporter of classical liberalism, particularly of laissez-faire economics. For Duplessis, private investment was generally the only way forward for the province, which he argued was the case as "the government [couldn't] do everything because the moment it [did], liberty [would] disappear". If there was any role for the provincial government, it was rather to provide infrastructure necessary for the growth of businesses and the regulatory framework to keep costs of running businesses low.

There is considerable dispute about whether Quebec grew stronger than its neighbouts. Vincent Geloso also argues in his book, Rethinking Canadian Economic Growth and Development since 1900: The Quebec Case, that the post-war era was the age of "The Great Catch-Up" and is attributable to Duplessis's policies, citing higher growth than in the United States and a relative increase of Quebeckers' incomes compared to Ontario, British Columbia, Canada in general, or the United States. Reviewers of the book were more skeptical of the claims: Pierre Fortin pointed to the fact that most of the income growth happened immediately after the war and opined that the rest may be attributed to lower population growth, which explains the relative per capita growth of Quebec's incomes; another reviewer stated that similar phenomenons were occurring in Alberta, Saskatchewan and New Brunswick, which had governments with different ideological and economical attitudes from Duplessis's, and suggested that the favourable concentration of wartime industries in Quebec was the reason behind the apparent faster growth. Another study suggested that the growth in 1947–1957 was slower than the Canadian average and lagged behind Ontario's, which Sarra-Bournet attributed to the shifting patterns of industrialization away that left Quebec on the periphery of the centre of economical activity, which moved towards the Great Lakes. Richard Jones wrote that the Ontario-Quebec gap persisted, but without specifying its dynamics during Duplessis's term.

Regardless of this debate, the overall performance of Quebec's economy was generally strong. Average real GDP growth of Quebec was positive throughout Duplessis's post-war terms. Recessions in Quebec were shorter than elsewhere and mostly caused by external factors. A substantial part of the growth during Duplessis's era came from foreign investments in the Quebec economy, propelled by the demand for natural resources that were abundant in the province. Jean-Luc Migué estimates that industrial growth from 1935 to 1955 was faster than either Canada's or Ontario's and was just above 10% per annum. Quebec's economy enjoyed almost full employment for a decade, having total unemployment rates of around 3% - only slightly higher than in Canada or Ontario - and any appreciable structural unemployment only started to appear after 1955. While the situation became gradually worse by the end of 1950s as the economy slowed, with 9% unemployment by 1960, the real growth trend province-wide remained positive. Wages and salaries were increasing slightly faster than in the rest of Canada.

On the long term, the budget was balanced and more years saw surpluses than deficits. Duplessis, who was likely traumatized by the tumultuous first term as premier, hated borrowing on the public account and resisted any programs that meant increased expenditures whenever he could, which resulted in debt service costs falling on a per capita basis to the lowest level in Canada. This penchant for fiscal conservatism notwithstanding, expenditures increased dramatically: the budget of 1959 was three times larger in real terms than that of 1944.

Development remained regionally unequal. Most of the investment, as well as population and financial growth, came to the financial capital of Canada of the time, Montreal, which enjoyed a fairly high standard of life, comparable to Ontario. On the other hand, the rest of Quebec was lagging far behind and, in terms of prosperity, was about equal to the much poorer Maritimes. Therefore, Duplessis's years saw a rural exodus towards larger cities, particularly to Montreal, where suburbanization processes have begun. The premier's ideological commitment to the countryside, however, meant that he still enacted policies favourable for these areas, such as government-sponsored programs to install drainage and sewage facilities, the province-wide prohibition on margarine to protect dairy interests, and more cheap rural loans. These farmers could also reap benefits from electrification, provided by the government-run , as well as new machinery to increase productivity.

Industry and infrastructure 
Duplessis welcomed any investments that came into Quebec, including from American or Anglo-Canadian entrepreneurs, and made few state-based investments in the mining, logging, or manufacturing industry. The premier actively solicited investments from Americans and regularly held personal negotiations with representatives of big American companies. The government pursued an approach of low taxation and generally imposed few conditions on the functioning of the natural resources sector, which was among the fastest-growing in the province. The fact that Duplessis's enforcement of labour laws was to the greatest extent accommodating for the employers, or not enforced if that was to mean benefits for the trade unions, also helped gain favour in these circles.

Among the important new production capacities built during Duplessis's tenure were the paper plants of the Canadian International Paper Company in Gatineau, another paper facility in Baie-Comeau (now owned by Resolute Forest Products) and Johns Manville's asbestos mines. However, the largest new natural resources project was related to iron ore deposits in central Labrador Peninsula. The terms of the lease attracted much controversy, with the opposition decrying them as selling the ore "for a cent per tonne" (un sou la tonne), though scholars are unable to agree if this slogan is indeed correct. The Liberals further despised the fact that the profits went to American and English-Canadian shareholders, rather than to French Canadians. While proposals were made to create smelting factories on the Côte-Nord, there was no political will to do that in Duplessis's times, and it is unclear whether Duplessis could actually succeed in ordering local processing of the ore.

The only major state investments under Duplessis related to the industry were into infrastructure. Hydro-Québec developed rapidly by putting to service the Bersimis-1 and Bersimis-2 hydroelectric generators and starting the construction on the main dam on the Manicouagan River in 1959. Road infrastructure was also rapidly developed, though this normally happened within the clientelist frameworks set by the Union Nationale. Most investments were concentrated in rural areas, where the party's strongholds were located. On the other hand, Duplessis's government largely ignored the congestion problems of Montreal and was lagging in the development of high-capacity motorways (autoroutes). The first one, the A-15, was only opened in 1959.

Labour relations 

While Duplessis was courting big corporations to invest in Quebec, his attitude towards trade unions was far from amicable. Conrad Black writes that Duplessis supported the working class but for so long as it was not unionized - for him, unions were unnecessary as labour already was in plentiful supply but capital to develop industries, where this workforce would work, was not. Jacques Rouillard adds that Duplessis did not oppose unionization per se, but due to his strong attachment to law and order, he resented any confrontations between workers and their employers. His government was the only one at the time to be actively employing tactics against the expansion of unions.

Some worker protections were passed in the first term. For example, the practice where the employers fired employees only to return them to work with a lower salary was banned. The policy, however, was ineffective, as companies increasingly stopped negotiating with the workers and were bypassing the trade unions while asking for government's intervention during strikes. This was the case with the Dominion Textile strike in August 1937 and another one in a shipyard in Sorel, when Duplessis, who saw the protests as "unfortunate and unjustified", ordered employees to return to work before starting negotiations. Trade unions were disadvantaged: closed shop and union shop arrangements were banned, the government sued unions that the government did not recognize and, perhaps most importantly, a law was passed that granted the government the right to unilaterally amend any collective bargaining agreements already in force.

The anti-union activities further continued during his second term. The Padlock Law, enacted in 1937, was now increasingly used against trade union activists rather than the original target of suspected communists; also, since 1949, the Worker Relations Commission (CRO) was instructed to deny recognition to any trade union that allowed communists or their sympathisers as members. The CRO itself had a consistent pro-business bias under Duplessis and was actively using its powers to deny recognition to new trade unions, or rescind certification to existing organizations, often without justification and as a punishment for the union's excessive activism. Duplessis also banned unionization and collective bargaining for public sector employees, sabotaged efforts to pass amendments that could prevent employer abuse of the labour laws and allowed municipalities to effectively prohibit soliciting for strike action.

When strikes did occur, the provincial police would often help employers by escorting strikebreakers to the workplace, breaking through the strikes and intimidating the strikers by their massive presence. Among the most important strikes of the era was the widely publicised Asbestos strike, which he, as Attorney General, ordered to forcibly and violently disperse the protesters. Even though the strike largely ended in failure for the unions, it is ingrained in the collective memory of Quebeckers as "the finest hour for the organized labour movement", or even as a victory for it, in a large degree thanks to a 1956 publication edited by Pierre Trudeau, future prime minister of Canada. This work depicts the conflict as a struggle between an autocratic and repressive government with a pro-business bias on one side, and workers demanding basic rights on the other. The Asbestos strike is often considered a turning point in the history of Quebec.

Social services 
Duplessis decried the federal government's efforts to expand the welfare state as a violation of provincial autonomy and as an offensive of "Anglo-Saxon and Protestant 'socialism'". In particular, the leader of the Union Nationale often asserted that the programs were unconstitutional and argued that the money that Ottawa spent on these services came from taxes that should have been levied by the provinces in the first place, and therefore should not have been managed by the federal government. This, for instance, was the case with the family allowances. However, the premier generally did not want to introduce these programs himself, as he considered the welfare state a form of paternalism that must be avoided, and stressed that the government "cannot replace charity and philanthropy". Duplessis thus opposed the expansion of old age pensions, a comprehensive health insurance scheme, and called for the private actors to provide services which the government could not or wished not to. In fact, in 1959, according to calculations made by Yves Vaillancourt, only 21.3% of funds allocated to social services originated from the provincial government, while the rest went from Ottawa; most of the provincial programs, unlike the federal ones, were long-standing, the newest being accepted in 1938, and few changes were made within the programs despite their inadequacies.

The government itself did not appear to have a coherent social policy, and any intervention it pursued was situational, discretionary and even arbitrary, rather than systematic. Due to the limited capacity of charity, the sick, the unemployed and the poor were often left without any assistance. As it used to be the case, most services were still provided by the Catholic Church (both contracted by the government and on charity); there were few professional social service workers employed by the government.

Education and culture 

It cannot be said that Duplessis did not act at all in the social sphere, and this is most evident within the educational domain. However, for ideological reasons, the role of the state was intentionally limited. The government was only there to aid the educational process rather than to implement it. According to these ideas, the role of the parent in education was considered the most important of all, while the actual in-school teaching was performed by the Catholic Church using state funds. Cultural development was treated as an extension of education and, in policy considerations, they were considered inseparable from each other; therefore, it was often a subject of disputes between Le Chef and the federal government as education policy remained a provincial matter.

The government created the Ministry of Social Welfare and Youth in 1946, in part to prepare the growing baby-boom generation for the industrial needs of post-war Quebec and in part as an assertion of provincial autonomy, though the Provincial Secretariat retained control over most of the educational functions. Expenditures for schools and the youth skyrocketed from $21.4 million in the 1946–47 budget to over $200 million in the budget of 1959–60, with a focus on professional education in technical subjects and scholarships to foreign universities, though substantial funds were also poured into art schools, conservatories and in support of crafts. More than 4,000 schools were built under his tenure, mostly those that substituted the one-room schools with more modern buildings, or those in the countryside. Enrolment increased and in 1956, the school curriculum was reformed to create public secondary schools.

Still, serious problems remained within that domain throughout Duplessis's tenure. The teachers' salaries still were very low, and the system was complex, disorganized, often unsuited to the challenges of the post-war era and struggling to cope with the ever-increasing stream of baby boomers. School districts, which were reliant on property taxes for funding, were often underfunded and in deep debt. Crucially, despite the fact that the laws of the time mandated primary school participation, they were weakly enforced by the Duplessis government, so that in 1958, 37% of French Canadian students who began primary school never finished it and only 13% finished full secondary education (as opposed to 36% of Protestant population). The problem of inadequate school enrolment was a long-term one, but despite Duplessis's attempts to resolve it with increased funding, it only disappeared with the reforms of the 1960s. The efforts to support the French language or to reach out to other Francophone cultures were rather insignificant, and low-quality French was so commonly spoken at the time that it became subject of a 1959 editorial by André Laurendeau, which popularized the term "joual", as well as one of the themes of Les Insolences du Frère Untel.

The access to education was also different depending on language and was much easier in English than in French. While the Anglophone population (under the Protestant school commission) was generally able to attend university straight after 11 years of public schooling, for the majority Francophone population, the only way to get to a university was through a classical college, which provided only general education in the humanities and neglected technical sciences, was not free and was not available to women. Those who managed to finish secondary education generally could choose out of five universities in Quebec (six since the opening of the University of Sherbrooke in 1954), three of which were Anglophone, and the graduates were also disproportionately English-speaking. The French-language universities in Duplessis's times were intended to carry out the policy of preserving the Catholic French Canadian culture, which was one of the reasons why Duplessis refused federal university subsidies, while at the same time making higher education closely connected to the needs of businesses (hence the new construction involved the Mining School, the Faculty of Geodesy and Forestry at the Université Laval, and the Faculty of Sciences in Sherbrooke). Funding for universities remained at a rather low level, which caused a student strike in 1958.

Healthcare 

Healthcare, just like education, was generally not considered to be a major area of government intervention. The onus to provide healthcare was often on charity and philanthropy, and emphasis was made on the individual to resolve their health issues. There was no government interest in providing universal healthcare coverage. The plans to introduce it that appeared during the term of Adélard Godbout as a result of the Provincial commission of inquiry into hospitals (the Lessard Commission) were scrapped after Duplessis became Premier for the second time. Thus, in 1949, healthcare was mostly financed by the patients themselves paying to the doctors, the hospitals or for private medical insurance packages (67.8% of total costs). Duplessis's government refused to join the joint federal-provincial healthcare insurance plan established by the Hospital Insurance and Diagnostic Services Act of 1957 on provincial autonomy grounds, and it was only in 1961 that Quebec started participating in it.

The government achieved much progress in treating tuberculosis by deploying mobile units to far-flung places, whose employees provided basic hygiene advice to the general population and treated newborn children. The units proved very efficient, but they remained underfunded. Another achievement was the reduction of the difference between the life expectancy of Quebeckers and Canadians: while in 1944, men and women in Quebec were expected to live 2.7 and 3.2 years fewer than the Canadian average, respectively, this decreased to 1.2 and 1.5 years in 1959. Most of the reduction happened immediately after World War II. That said, by the end of Duplessis's rule, the healthcare system remained ineffective and chaotic, and it lagged behind the other proivinces.

The Duplessis years saw a rapid increase of healthcare funding: in 1948–1956, the average rate of healthcare expenditures increase was 23.3% per annum. A portion of the new funds was invested in building new or enlarging existing hospitals. Quebec experienced a dire shortage of hospital beds due to the fact that previous governments neglected investments in this domain, but these massive construction projects only modestly increased hospital bed availability as the province's population was booming, and it still remained the worst among all provinces in 1954. Most of the money, however, went on to finance an ever-increasing burden set by the Public Charities Act of 1921 (Loi de l'assistance publique), which allowed people considered indigent to receive the limited free healthcare services the law allowed them to. The subsidies for them proved insufficient as hospitals could not keep up with the escalating expenses and since charity funding, which contributed to 13.3% of the total healthcare expenditure, was drying up. Healthcare workers were overburdened and worked on low salaries.

Primarily under the second premiership of Duplessis, multiple hospitals run by the Catholic Church deliberately misdiagnosed several thousand otherwise healthy orphaned or abandoned children with mental illnesses to get increased federal subsidies for the construction and maintenance of mental asylums, which were much more generous than assistance provided for orphanages. Duplessis personally urged the high clergy, and passed statutes to that effect, to change the classification of orphanages to mental asylums so as to reduce the financial burden on the provincial government. Children under custody of the church officials were often abused, beaten and medicated even though that treatment was not justified by their needs.

Notes

References

Books used

Sources 

Maurice Duplessis
Canadian premierships
1940s in Canada
1930s in Canada
1950s in Canada
1930s in Quebec
1940s in Quebec
1950s in Quebec
1936 establishments in Quebec
1939 disestablishments in Quebec
1944 establishments in Quebec
1959 disestablishments in Quebec